The Karadere is a river that empties into the Black Sea 20 miles east of Trabzon, Turkey.  In ancient times it was known as the Hyssos or Hyssus.

See also

 Sürmene, ancient Hyssos

References

Rivers of Turkey
Landforms of Trabzon Province